The Chalkeaters is an English-language music band from St. Petersburg, Russia that composes comedy songs about video games.

Musicians Alios, Ergy, and Tim Maslov founded the project in 2018. Later, Pondis, an artist, and Lenich, a video designer, joined the permanent lineup of the band. The music team became known online after releasing viral music video "Doom Crossing: Eternal Horizons" in 2020, which, as of January 2023, received over 50 million views on YouTube.

The Chalkeaters write songs of various genres and produce their own original animated videos mocking well-known game series, characters, and faces of the game industry. The band describes their work as "overproduced shitpost," meaning they try to make goofy songs about Internet memes to the best possible quality. The Chalkeaters invite famous vocalists to their projects: Ellen McLean and Johnny Gioeli, as well as YouTube musicians Black Gryph0n and The Stupendium, have sung their songs.

History 
The band was formed by St. Petersburg musicians who had previously played together in the rock band BroniKoni. In 2018, after the release of albums Friendship Express and EP Bingo, the leader and songwriter Alios (Alexander Serebro) invited the guitarist Ergy (Sergey Gumba) and the sound engineer Tim Maslov to create a YouTube side-project with songs about video games. They decided to invite foreign singers for vocals, so that English-language lyrics would sound more authentic.

The first song released was the pop-punk composition "Bowsette", dedicated to a popular meme about the female version of Bowsette from the Super Mario Bros games. In the track, Bowsette repeatedly kidnaps Princess Peach in order to win Mario's heart. Maria Gorbunova, nick-named M-G UniNew, performed vocal part as Bowsette, while the role of Mario was played by rapper Nekro G.

"It Just Works" music video was released in June 2019 and mocked the many problems of Bethesda Game Studios and their games, as well as the unfulfilled promises of its head Todd Howard. Howard appears in the video as the villain of the musical video: despite bugs and flaws, his games will continue to be bought, because "it just works." The role of Todd was played by Kyle Wright, and the jazz arrangement was recorded live by St. Petersburg brass musicians. Video blogger The Quartering An inserted an excerpt from the video into his video, which led to the first noticeable increase in views and subscribers to the project.

The next music video for the song "Breathtaking" was released in November 2019. The clip referenced Keanu Reeves' performance at the 2019 E3 video game show, where the actor responded to a shout-out from the audience calling him awesome by saying that the awesome were fans, which spawned numerous memes about love for Keanu and his kindness. It is described as a message of love for the actor. The video contains humorous references to Keanu's roles and game industry events.

In April 2020, the music video "Doom Crossing: Eternal Horizons" was released and became a major hit for the band. As of January 2023, it has over 50 million views on YouTube. The song is dedicated to the meme of Doomguy and Isabelle's friendship, which stemmed from the fact that the ultra-violent shooter Doom Eternal and the super-cute game Animal Crossing: New Horizon were released on the same day, on March 20, 2020. In the story, Isabelle is walking about a peaceful, quiet island, but Doomguy suddenly enters that world. He finds common ground with the heroine, teaches her how to shoot and calls her into his world to fight demons. In the music video, the action shifts abruptly between innocent fun on the island and nightmarish battles in the hell. The visual style and music genres change accordingly. The American singer Natalia Natchan, known as PiNKII, voices Isabelle, and Jonathan Luhmann appears as the "Brutal Voice of DOOM."

In May 2020, the group released a pop song, "Lock Me Up (Quarantine Song)". In the song, the singer Idrise, acting as a joyful gamer, is excited to get through all his favorite games while staying home because of the quarantine caused by the Covid-19 pandemic.

In 2021, "Count to Three" music video was released, depicting Valve Studio and its CEO Gabe Newell. The clip mocks the studio for not releasing the third parts of their popular series and their lack of major new single-player projects, with the developers having very high royalties. The video features Ellen McLain in a cameo appearance, as the voice actress for GLaDOS, the robotic antagonist of the Portal games. The actress praised the group's past work and was happy to return to a role in a fan project. The intro for the video was recorded by Gabe Newell himself, he also gave permission to use the images of the games' characters and for McLain to play the role of GLaDOS. Because of the involvement of the studio officials, some viewers of the video thought the video was a hint at the imminent announcement of Half-Life 3. In the song itself, British blogger and musician The Stupendium sang as Gabe. The video has surpassed 13 million views.

In November 2021, The Chalkeaters along with other artists, participated in creating a video that showcased the evolution of games for a show celebrating 50 years of video games at the 39th Golden Joystick Awards 2021. The musicians performed a segment about the Doom and Animal Crossing.

"Crushing Thirties" music video was released in January 2022 and it commemorated the 30th anniversary of the Sonic the Hedgehog game series. The clip ironized the topic of growing up, showing how the thirtysomething Sonic sinks into the midlife crisis. Dr. Eggman retired and was no longer a villain, resulting in Sonic loitering at home while the bills piled up — something his wife Amy Rose rebuked him for. In the video, you could also spot Knuckles, Tales, and Krim, who had similarly grown up and become bogged down in routine. The style of the song referenced the hard rock band Crush 40, famous for their vocal themes in the Sonic Adventure series of games, and that band's lead vocalist Johnny Gioeli performed the vocal part.

In April 2022, Alios, head of The Chalkeaters, criticized Russia's invasion of Ukraine and announced that the band was leaving the country. Two months later, the Chalkeaters announced that some of the band members had moved to Georgia, Israel, and the United Kingdom.

In June 2022, "Rise Guys", a dramatic ballad about the characters in the game Fall Guys, was released. The vocalist was British singer Dennis DeMille.

In September 2022, the animated music video "A Songus Amongus" was released, in which The Chalkeaters first introduced their mascot, Professor Chalk. According to the plot of the clip, Chalke falls into paranoia and starts seeing silhouettes of the characters of the Among Us game everywhere, from chicken nuggets to the writing characters of the Sinhalese language, one of the official languages of Sri Lanka. The video mocks the meme that everything around us looks like Among Us characters, as well as the obsession of fans with the game. For example, it mocks the fact that a McDonald's chicken nugget shaped like an Among Us character was sold on eBay for nearly $100,000. American singer and blogger Gabriel Brown performed the Professor's vocal part. The singer is better known on YouTube as Black Gryph0n. The clip was praised by Marcus Bromander, founder of InnerSloth, the developer of Among Us.

In November 2022, the band released the song "Furrýmon: Gotta Smash 'Em All!". In the animated video, Professor Chalk wanted to become a Pokemon trainer, but discovered they were sexualized Furries. Black Gryph0n returned to the role of the Professor, and the role of the vaporeon rapper was played by PiNKII, who had previously played the role of Isabelle in Doom Crossing.

Discography
Singles 
2019 — Bowsette (feat. M-G UniNew & Nekro G)
2019 — It Just Works (feat. Kyle Wright)
2019 — Breathtaking (feat. Natalia Natchan)
2020 — Doom Crossing: Eternal Horizons (feat. Natalia Natchan)
2020 — Lock Me Up (Quarantine Song) (feat. Idrise)
2020 — It's a Gamer's Christmas feat. (Natalia Natchan)
2021 — Count to Three (feat. The Stupendium & Ellen McLain)
2022 — Crushing Thirties (feat. Johnny Gioeli)
2022 — Rise Guys (feat. Dennis DeMille)
2022 — A Songus Amongus (feat. Black Gryph0n)
2022 — Furrýmon: Gotta Smash 'Em All! (feat. Black Gryph0n & PiNKII)

Members
Musicians
Alios — producer, composer, lyrics writer 
Tim Maslov — composer, musical producer 
Ergy — guitarist, arranger 
Artists and animators
Pondis — art director, main artist 
Lenich — video designer 
Yumi the Cat — animator (Count to Three, Doom Crossing: Eternal Horizons) 
Hunternif — artist (Count to Three, Doom Crossing: Eternal Horizons, Rise Guys) 
debr0dis — animation director (Crushing Thirties, Furrýmon: Gotta Smash 'Em All!)
Anchorpoint — video designer (Rise Guys)
Benedique — animator (A Songus Amongus).

Guest artists
M-G UniNew (Bowsette)
Nekro G (Bowsette)
PiNKII[9] (Breathtaking, Doom Crossing: Eternal Horizons, It's a Gamer's Christmas, Furrýmon: Gotta Smash 'Em All!)
Idrise (Lock Me Up).
Ellen McLain (Count to Three)
The Stupendium (Count to Three)
Johnny Gioeli(Crushing Thirties)
Dennis DeMille (Rise Guys)
Black Gryph0n (A Songus Amongus, Furrýmon: Gotta Smash 'Em All!)

Criticism and reviews
In an article about the release of the "Breathtaking" music video, Nerdist's Kelly Knox wrote that the song depicted the video game industry as gray and cynical, and only highlighted by the participation of Keanu Reeves. The journalist praised Natalia Natchan's vocals and called the animation ethereal. She noted that although in some places it is noticeable that it had not been a native speaker that had written the lyrics, this only added to the charm and authenticity of the emotion behind this song.

In a review of the "A Songus Amongus" music video, a journalist from PCGamer called the video really cute, and compared Harry Partridge's Skyrim songs from the long-passed 2011, calling them just cheeky, sincere, and fun. Journals appreciated the change of genres in A Songus Amongus, where the pop music was replaced by a funky dance part, and some metal was also added.

The author praised the band In his article about "Doom Crossing" posted on TheGamer, calling the union of ukulele-based pop music with power metal impressive and the video itself brilliant.

The website of RBKgames mentioned the "It Just Works" music video in their list of top memes of 2019.

The Gamer website's review of the song "Count To Three" called the performance great, and the author was initially confused and thought Gabe Newell was singing the entire song.

Ellen McLain admitted that she was flattered to be asked to perform as GLaDOS again in "Count To Three". The actress called the song a wonderful composition, very well written and clever, praising the lyrics and music, too. In addition, she praised the other performers, especially the voices of Alix and Gabe. YouTube video bloggers and letsplayer PewDiePie did a video reaction to the video, where he called the song really catchy and The Chalkeaters a very cool band.

References

Musical groups established in 2019